On the Line is the third and final album by American soul singer Michael Wycoff.

Track listing

Personnel 
 Michael Wycoff – lead and backing vocals, keyboards, piano, synthesizer
 Webster Lewis – keyboards, piano, synthesizer, backing vocals, arrangements
 Leo Nocentelli, Miles Joseph – guitar
 Denzil Miller – synthesizer
 James Gadson – drums, backing vocals, assistant producer
 David Shields, Nathan Watts – bass
 Eddie "Bongo" Brown – percussion
 Dorothy Ashby – harp
 Anthony Wells (track: A1), Brenda White King (track: B1), Cheryl James, Delores Sanders, Fonzi Thornton (track: B1), Kathy Thompson, Lynn Rochelle, Michelle Cobbs (tracks: B1), Phillip Ballou (tracks: B1), Robert Wright – backing vocals
 H.B. Barnum (tracks: A1, A4), Webster Lewis – string arrangements
Technical
James Gadson - assistant producer
Robert Wright - co-producer on "On the Line" and "Tell Me Love"
Nick Sangiamo - photography

Charts

Singles

References

External links 
 Michael Wycoff-On The Line at Discogs

1983 albums
Albums arranged by H. B. Barnum
RCA Records albums